Richard Craig Hill (born January 19, 1934) was a Canadian professional automobile racer. Hill died at his home in West Lorne, Ontario on November 1, 2012.

Racing career
In a driving career that spanned almost 40 years, Craig Hill raced and won in almost every type of racing car, from midgets and super-modified stock cars to sports cars and sophisticated open-wheel formula cars. He was Canadian Formula B champion in 1969 and 1970, driving a Formula Ford he modified to formula B spec. He co-drove with Ludwig Heimrath to win the Sundown Grand Prix in 1973 and 1974.

He was inducted into the Canadian Motorsport Hall of Fame in 1996.

Other Motorsports Involvement
As advertising and promotions manager of Castrol Canada, he was involved in that company's investment in Canadian motorsport.

See also
Formula Atlantic

References

http://www.oldracingcars.com/canada/1969/

https://web.archive.org/web/20120730044206/http://www.canammidgets.com/history.htm
http://www.motorsportscentral.com/formula-a.asp

External links

Memorandum

1934 births
2012 deaths
Canadian racing drivers
Racing drivers from Ontario
Sportspeople from Hamilton, Ontario